Brebières is a commune in the Pas-de-Calais department in the Hauts-de-France region in northern France.

Geography
This farming and light industrial town is located 12 miles (19 km) east of Arras on the N50 road, at the junction with the D44 and D307, by the banks of the Scarpe river.

A celebration of the potato takes place annually on the first Sunday in September.

History
Evidence of occupation from Merovingian times has been unearthed. In 2008, during the creation of the 60 hectare Bèliers industrial zone, three important archaeological sites, once occupied by Gauls and Celts, were discovered. Finds include the residue of iron smelting, glass beads, pottery and bones of both animals and humans.

Population

Sights
 The church of St. Vaast, reconstructed after 1918.
 The Château de La Bucquière.

See also
Communes of the Pas-de-Calais department

References

External links

 Official website of the commune 

Communes of Pas-de-Calais